Fractures in the Facade of Your Porcelain Beauty is the second EP by American metalcore band Atreyu. It was originally released on November 20, 2001, and released again on January 29, 2002, under the independent label Tribunal Records. The EP has early versions of the songs "Living Each Day Like You're Already Dead", "Someone's Standing on My Chest" and "Tulips Are Better", which were re-worked and included on the band's next release, Suicide Notes and Butterfly Kisses. The EP was released before the band's huge success following their first album and original pressings are increasingly hard to find. The vocalist, Alex Varkatzas, has a deeper approach to his screams on this album compared to Suicide Notes and Butterfly Kisses. The album is the first Atreyu release with Travis Miguel on rhythm guitar, as opposed to the Visions EP which only had the founding guitarist, Dan Jacobs.

Track listing

Personnel 
Band line-up
 Alex Varkatzas -  unclean vocals
 Daniel Jacobs - lead guitar
 Travis Miguel - rhythm guitar
 Chris Thomson - bass
 Brandon Saller - drums, clean vocals

Additional credits
 Alex Varkatzas and Chad Tafolla – album concept and layout
 Corinne and Matt Gigliotti - live photographs
 Atreyu - producer
 Paul Miner – producer, engineer, mixing

References 

Atreyu (band) albums
2001 EPs